The Ministry of Environment, Water and Climate is a government ministry, responsible for water resources management, rural development, climate and environment in Zimbabwe. The incumbent is Nqobizitha Mangaliso Ndlovu. It oversees:
 Zimbabwe National Water Authority
 District Development Fund
 Zimbabwe Parks and Wildlife Management Authority
 Environmental Management Agency formerly Department of Natural Resources

Environmental Management Agency 
Environmental Management Agency (EMA) is a statutory body responsible for ensuring the sustainable  utilization natural resources and protection of the environmental degradation. It is a parastatal under the Ministry of Environment, Water and Climate.  

EMA was established under the Environmental Management Act (Chapter 20:27) of 2002. the Act was operationalized on 17 March 2003 through statutory Instrument 103 of 2003

EMA's Goals 
A Clean safe and healthy environment, supporting an empowered society a sustainable growing economy by 2030

 to increase compliance with regulation and standards. 
 to establish up to date baseline and data bases for environmental information.
 to raise environmental awareness.
 to increase organisational capacity and maintain accountability, transparency and utilization of EMA resources,.
 to increase stakeholder participation in environmental enforcement, projects and programs.
 to amend and develop a comprehensive body of legislation and formulate environmental quality standards.

References

Government of Zimbabwe
Environment of Zimbabwe
National parks of Zimbabwe
Zimbabwe